"The Underdog" is a song by indie rock band Spoon. It was released as the lead single from their sixth studio album, Ga Ga Ga Ga Ga (2007), on July 5, 2007. The song was written by frontman Britt Daniel and produced by Jon Brion along with the band. The song reached No. 26 on the Billboard Alternative Songs chart.

The band performed the song on the October 6, 2007, episode of the 33rd season of Saturday Night Live. It was featured in the 2008 film Cloverfield, the 2009 films I Love You, Man and 17 Again, in the opening and ending scene of the 2011 film Horrible Bosses, and in the 2017 film Spider-Man: Homecoming.

Music video

The music video was directed by Keven McAllester.

Chart positions

References

Further reading 

 https://wers.org/spoon-interview/

2007 singles
Spoon (band) songs
2007 songs
Merge Records singles
Song recordings produced by Jon Brion